Bergsjö IF is a Swedish football club located in Göteborg.

Background
Bergsjö IF currently plays in Division 4 Göteborg A which is the sixth tier of Swedish football. They play their home matches at the Bergsjövallen in Göteborg.

The club is affiliated to Göteborgs Fotbollförbund. Bergsjö IF have competed in the Svenska Cupen on 8 occasions and have played 12 matches in the competition.

Season to season

In their most successful period Bergsjö IF competed in the following divisions:

In recent seasons Bergsjö IF have competed in the following divisions:

Footnotes

External links
 Bergsjö IF – Official website
 Bergsjö IF on Facebook

Football clubs in Gothenburg
1964 establishments in Sweden
Football clubs in Västra Götaland County